Elizabeth Maureen Walters is an American politician. She was elected chair of the Ohio Democratic Party on January 14, 2021, and has also served on the Summit County Council since February 2016 and as president since January 1, 2019.

References

Cleveland State University alumni
Living people
Ohio Democrats
Saint Vincent College alumni
State political party chairs of Ohio
Year of birth missing (living people)